Tanweer Hasan is a Bangladeshi academic and Vice-Chancellor of the Independent University, Bangladesh.

Early life 
Hasan studied at the Mirzapur Cadet College. In 1986, Hasan graduated with a B.Com in finance from the University of Dhaka. In 1989, he completed an MBA from Baylor University. He did his Management Development Program from the Harvard University. In 1993, he completed his PhD from the University of Houston.

Career 
Hasan was a professor of accounting and finance at the Roosevelt University. He was based in the Robin Campus of the University. He was an Associate Provost at the University. He was a visiting fellow at the Institute for Inclusive Finance and Development.

On 23 February 2021, Hasan was appointed Vice-Chancellor of the Independent University, Bangladesh. He was given a four year term. He provided laptops to new faculties of the university sponsored by Abdul Hai Sarker, chairman of the board of trustee and Purbani Group. He signed an agreement to host the King Sejong Institute in the university.

References 

Living people
University of Dhaka alumni
Vice-Chancellors of Bangladesh Islami University
Harvard University alumni
University of Houston alumni
Roosevelt University faculty
Baylor University alumni
Year of birth missing (living people)